École de technologie supérieure (ÉTS) or School of higher technologies, founded in 1974, is a public research university in Montreal, Quebec, Canada and affiliated to the Université du Québec system.

The school is specialized in applied teaching and research in engineering as well as transferring advanced technologies to companies, where professors, engineers and researchers are recognized for their practical, industrial, and innovative approaches.

In any given year, 25% of all engineers receiving a diploma from an engineering school or faculty in the province of Quebec graduate from the ÉTS and ranks second in Canada for the number of bachelor's degrees in engineering awarded at the undergraduate level. Hence, it is ranked first in Quebec and second in Canada for the total number of engineering diplomas awarded annually.

History 

 Campus La Patrie: 1974 to 1985

ÉTS opened its doors in 1974 on rue Sainte-Catherine, in Montreal, and received 28 undergraduate students in technology (mechanics and electricity). The ÉTS Student Association (AEETS) was created the following year. In 1977, the diploma (B. Tech.) was awarded to the first 14 graduates. Bachelor's degrees in construction technology and automated production were added later on.

 Henri-Julien Campus: 1985 to 1997

The first student club (Mini-Baja ÉTS) was created in 1989. The same year, ÉTS opened its first bachelor's degrees in engineering: construction engineering, mechanical engineering, electrical engineering, automated production engineering (B.Eng. ). In 1990, they were accredited by the Canadian Engineering Accreditation Board (BCAPI). In 1991, the master's program (systems technology) will be offered. The Center for Technological Entrepreneurship (Centech) was created in 1994. The same year, the students created the Student Grouping Program for International Cooperation (PRÉCI).

 Notre Dame Campus: 1998 to 2014

In 1998, ÉTS inaugurated the first student residences and several phases were added over the decades. The first doctoral degrees in engineering were awarded in 2000 and research professors are increasingly active. The first research chair was created in 2001 (in wireless telecommunications). The same year, the Sports Center created the Les Piranhas club. In 2004, the Department of Software Engineering and Information Technology Engineering was opened and a new pavilion was inaugurated (Pavilion B). In 2007, a major expansion of the main pavilion was completed. In 2008, ÉTS adopted a sustainable development policy. Many study programs are added over the years, as well as student clubs.

 The campus expands: 2015 to present

In 2015, the campus expanded further with the opening of the Student House (Pavilion E). In 2018, the former Dow Planetarium was completely renovated and the technology business accelerator Centech moved there. ÉTS adopts an urban development plan for the campus in order to integrate it harmoniously into the neighborhood. The Formula ÉTS student club is moving from the combustion engine to the electric motor starting in 2019. In 2020 a new pavilion was opened (Pavilion D). In 2021, ÉTS achieved carbon neutrality, nearly nine years before the deadline it had set. In 2023, major real estate projects are still in the pipeline.

Notable Alumni 
Charles Bombardier, Industrial designer, Entrepreneur, and investor.

Mathieu Lemay, Canadian politician.

Arvin Morattab and Aida Farzaneh,

Campuses and facilities

The main address of ÉTS is 1100 Notre-Dame Street West in Montreal's Griffintown neighbourhood, the site of a former O'Keefe Brewery, which was transformed to house the school. It has four buildings (Pavillon A, B, D, and E) devoted to education programs and research activities. The buildings are connected through the underground tunnels.

Pavillon A 
The facilities and offices within Pavillon A inlcude the library, cafetrial, registrar's office, office of the Dean of Studies, Department of constructiono engineering, graduate students' lounge, facilities management department, Department of electrical engineering, department of mechanical engineering, office of international relations, department of systems engineering, department of software engineering and information technologies.

Pavillon B 
Pavillon B, located on 1111 Notre-Dame Street West, Montreal, Montreal, is home to Coop ÉTS, Tim Hortons, Le 100 Génies Resto-pub, IT service counter, Daycare Centre, General education department, and Sports centre.

Pavillon D 
Pavillon D, located on 1219 William Street, Montreal, is home to AÉÉTS (student association), and Students groups and organizations.

Pavillon E 
Pavillon E or Maison des étudiants, located on 1220 Notre-Dame Street West, Montreal, is home to office of student life, ÉTS Continuing Education, Co-Operative Education Department.

Centech 
Located on 1000 Saint-Jacques street, Montreal, Centech is home to "Development of technology businesses".

INGO 
INGO, located on 355 Peel Street, Montréal, is home to "FDÉTS (ÉTS Development Fund)".

Residences | Phases 1, 2, 3, and 4 
Located on 301-311 Peel Street | 1045-1055 Ottawa Street, Montreal, residences phase 1 and 2 are the first 2 student residences built for ETS students. Phase 3 of the residences is located on 425 de la Montagne Street, Montreal, and phase 4 of the residences is located on 355 de la Montagne Street, Montreal. The  Bureau du respect de la personne of ETS is located in phase 4 of residences.

Programs
The school features cooperative education in all of its undergraduate programs. The bachelor's programs have all been accredited by the Canadian Engineering Accreditation Board (CEAB).  Each year, ETS graduates the largest number of engineers in Quebec and ranks second in Canada. 
Students can specialize in the following disciplines:
Construction Engineering, Electrical Engineering, Computer Engineering, Software Engineering, Mechanical Engineering, Production Engineering, Industrial Engineering
The university also offers multiple research programs leading to Master's degree or Doctor of Philosophy. International graduate students come from all five continents, including, notably, France, Brazil, Mexico, India, and Iran. The main research fields are energy, environment, manufacturing, health technologies, enterprise systems, IT, micro-electronics and telecommunications, aerospace manufacturing and avionics, project management, innovation management and many more.

Undergraduate programs

Bachelors 

 Bachelor of construction engineering
 Bachelor of electrical engineering
 Bachelor of software engineering
 Bachelor of mechanical engineering
 Bachelor of operations and logistics engineering
 Bachelor of automated manufacturing engineering
 Bachelor of information technology engineering
 Bachelor of software engineering
 Bachelor of distributed computing

University preparatory program in technology 

 Technological Academic Path.

Certificates 

 Certificate in economy and building project estimation.
 Certificate in quality management and assurance.
 Certificate in construction management.
 Certificate in facility management.
 Certificate in industrial production.
 Certificate in telecommunications.

Short programs 

 Short program in continuous improvement.
 Short program in economy and building project estimation.
 Short program in facility management.
 Short program in industrial management.
 Short program in productivity optimization.
 Short program in maintenance planning and management.
 Short program in telecommunications.

Graduate programs

Short graduate programs 

 Short graduate program in legal affairs for Engineers.
 Short graduate program in energy efficiency.
 Short graduate program in renewable energy Technologies.
 Short graduate program in international projects and global engineering.
 Short graduate program in construction engineering: cost management and time Management.
 Short graduate program in construction engineering: [regulations management]].
 Short graduate program in construction engineering: environmental hydraulics.
 Short graduate program in digital business.
 Short graduate program in construction engineering: design and rehabilitation.
 Short graduate program in environmental engineering.
 Short graduate program in automated manufacturing engineering: systems integration and automation.
 Short graduate program in automated manufacturing engineering: intelligent systems.
 Short graduate program in occupational health and safety (Risk reduction) engineering.
 Short graduate program in electrical engineering.
 Short graduate program in electrical engineering: industrial control.
 Short graduate program in electrical engineering: Modelling and processing information.
 Short graduate program in electrical engineering: Telecommunications and microelectronics.
 Short graduate program in mechanical engineering.
 Short graduate program in innovation management.
 Short graduate program in engineering project management.
 Short graduate program in management of international projects.
 Short graduate program in urban infrastructures management.
 Short graduate program in financial engineering.
 Short graduate program in surgical innovation.
 Short graduate program in building information modelling (BIM).
 Short graduate program in telecommunications networks.
 Short graduate program in occupational health and safety (Risk reduction) engineering.
 Short graduate program in healthcare technologies.
 Short graduate program in information technologies.

SPECIALIZED GRADUATE STUDIES DIPLOMAS (IN FRENCH, DESS) 

 DESS in BIM and digital innovations.
 DESS in renewable energies and energy efficiency.
 DESS in digital business.
 DESS in construction engineering: Design and rehabilitation projects.
 DESS in construction engineering: project management.
 DESS in environmental engineering.
 DESS in automated manufacturing Engineering: Integration and automation
 DESS in automated manufacturing Engineering: intelligent systems.
 DESS in occupational health and safety risks.
 DESS in electrical engineering.
 DESS in software engineering.
 DESS in mechanical engineering.
 DESS in innovation management.
 DESS in engineering project management.
 DESS in urban infrastructure management.
 DESS in international projects and global engineering.
 DESS in telecommunications networks.
 DESS in healthcare technologies.
 DESS in information technologies.

Masters 

 Masters in aerospace engineering.
 Masters in automated manufacturing engineering.
 Masters in electrical engineering.
 Masters in construction engineering.
 Masters in renewable energies and energy efficiency.
 Masters in international projects and global engineering.
 Masters in environmental engineering.
 Masters in engineering in occupational health and safety.
 Masters in engineering in healthcare technology.
 Masters in information technology engineering.
 Masters in mechanical Engineering.
 Masters in software engineering.
 Masters in urban Infrastructures engineering.
 Masters in innovation management.
 Masters in telecommunications network engineering.
 Masters in engineering with a personalized concentration.
 Masters in engineering with a concentration in design and management OF Canadian engineering projects.
 Masters in engineering project management.

Doctorate 

 Doctorate in Engineering in the fields of Aerospace, Energy, Environment, Infrastructure and built environment, Materials and manufacturing, Health, Information and communications technologies, and Land transportation.

Research groups and Chairs

Construction engineering department 

 HC3 – Groupe de recherche en hydrologie, climat et changements climatiques.
 DRSR – Équipe de développement et recherche en structures et réhabilitation.
 GRIDD – Groupe de recherche en intégration et développement durable en environnement bâti.
 LaRTIC - Laboratoire de recherche sur les technologies de l'information dans la construction.
 LCMB – Laboratoire sur les chaussées et matériaux bitumineux.
 LG2 – Laboratoire de géotechnique et de génie géoenvironnemental.
 STEPPE – Station expérimentales des procédés pilotes en environnement.

Electrical engineering department 

 Chaire de recherche du Canada en conversion de l’énergie électrique et en électronique de puissance.
 Chaire de recherche industrielle CRSNG–Ultra Electronics TCS en communications sans fil tactiques et d'urgence de haute performance.
 Chaire de recherche du Canada sur les matériaux et composants optoélectriques hybrides.
 GREPCI – Groupe de recherche en électronique de puissance et commande industrielle.
 LACIME – Laboratoire de communications et d'intégration de la microélectronique.

Mechanical engineering department 

 Industrial research chair in forming technologies for high-strength alloys.
 Canada Research Chair in the Biomechanics of Head and Spine Trauma.
 ETS-EERS Industrial Research Chair in In-ear Technologies.
 Natural and intuitive interaction laboratory for robot teleoperation (INIT Robots).
 DYNAMO – Research team in the dynamics of machines, structures and processes.
 LAMSI – Memory Alloys and Intelligent Systems Laboratory.
 LIPPS – Product, Process and Systems Engineering Laboratory.
 LOPFA – Laboratory for the optimization of advanced manufacturing processes.
 TFT – Laboratory of thermofluids for transport.

Systems Engineering Department 

 LARCASE – Active control, avionics and aeroservoelasticity research laboratory.
 LIVIA – Imaging, Vision and Artificial Intelligence Laboratory.
 Canada Research Chair in Aircraft Modeling and Simulation Technologies.
 LIO – Imaging and Orthopedics Research Laboratory.
 Canada Research Chair in 3D Imaging and Biomedical Engineering.
 Research Chair in Artificial Intelligence and Digital Health for Health Behavior Change.
 Marie-Lou and Yves Cotrel Research Chair in Orthopedics from the University of Montreal and ÉTS.

Software and Information Technology Engineering Department 

 LABMULTIMEDIA – Multimedia research laboratory.
 LASI – Computer systems architecture laboratory.
 LiNCS – Laboratory of Cognitive and Semantic Engineering.

Student technical clubs
The ETS student-run technical clubs participate in international competitions. The world's fastest human-powered submarine, Omer, was developed by one such club. An autonomous underwater vehicle named S.O.N.I.A., an unmanned aerial vehicle Dronolab, a walking robot, Eclipse solar-powered car, Chinook the world champion wind powered vehicle and many others have won countless prizes in international competitions over the years. The school also houses a concrete canoe club, the reigning Canadian champions three years running.

Sports
The school is represented in Canadian Interuniversity Sport by the ETS Piranhas.

Student union

The school's student union is called the Association étudiante de l'École de technologie supérieure (AÉÉTS) .

See also
 Higher education in Quebec
 List of universities in Quebec
 Canadian Interuniversity Sport
 Canadian government scientific research organizations
 Canadian university scientific research organizations
 Canadian industrial research and development organizations

References

Further reading
Ferretti, Lucia. L'Université en réseau: les 25 ans de l'Université du Québec. Sainte-Foy: Presses de l'Université du Québec, 1994.

External links
 Official website

Projects developed by undergraduates
 AlgoÉTS Algorithmic Trading Club
 Walking Machine Autonomous multifunction robot
 SONIA AUV Autonomous Underwater Vehicle
 Capra Autonomous Ground Vehicle
 Dronolab Autonomous Quadcopter
 Formula SAE Race Car
 Lan ETS Lan party
 Concrete Canoe Concrete Canoe
 Chinook wind powered vehicle
 RockETS High power Rocketry
 A.C.E. - Avion-Cargo ÉTS Remote control cargo airplane
 Omer submarine Human-powered submarine
 Géniale Brewing development

Students groups and clubs
 Conjure Video game development and interactive media lab

Other links
 SAE Formula Team Website
 IEEE-ÉTS Student Branch

 
Universities and colleges in Montreal
Université du Québec
Ecole de technologie
Engineering universities and colleges in Canada
Educational institutions established in 1974
Le Sud-Ouest
1974 establishments in Quebec